Pyeonghwa Station is a station on the Gyeongjeon Line in South Korea.

Railway stations in South Jeolla Province
Railway stations opened in 1967
1967 establishments in South Korea
20th-century architecture in South Korea